From Trash is the fourth studio album by John Foxx and Louis Gordon, released in 2006. Further material from the same sessions was released during the same year as Sideways.

Track listing

 "From Trash" — 4:34
 "Freeze Frame" — 3:57
 "Your Kisses Burn V2" — 5:01
 "Another You" — 3:47
 "Impossible" — 5:29
 "Never Let Me Go" — 3:15
 "A Room as Big as a City" — 4:40
 "A Million Cars" — 6:23
 "Friendly Fire" — 4:59
 "The One Who Walks Though You" — 4:05

 All tracks written by John Foxx and Louis Gordon.
 An earlier version of "Your Kisses Burn" appeared on the Nation 12 album Electrofear.

Personnel

 John Foxx — vocals, synthesisers
 Louis Gordon — synthesizers
 Dallas Simpson — mastering
 Dennis Leigh, Paul Agar — artwork

John Foxx albums
2006 albums